The Kadoorie Agricultural Aid Association (KAAA) was founded in 1951 in Hong Kong by two businessmen, Lawrence and Horace Kadoorie, to help destitute refugees transform their lives through various agricultural programmes.

See also
 Kadoorie Farm and Botanic Garden

References

External links

A Partnership with the People: KAAA and Post-war Agricultural Hong Kong, Hong Kong Memory 

Agriculture in Hong Kong
Charities based in Hong Kong